Apsilops hirtifrons is a species of ichneumon wasp in the family Ichneumonidae.

References

Further reading

 
 

Parasitic wasps
Articles created by Qbugbot
Insects described in 1896